Alexander Siebeck (born 3 November 1993) is a German professional footballer who plays as an attacking midfielder for Berliner FC Dynamo.

References

External links
 
 

1993 births
Living people
Footballers from Leipzig
German footballers
Association football midfielders
Regionalliga players
3. Liga players
2. Liga (Austria) players
RB Leipzig players
RB Leipzig II players
Karlsruher SC players
SC Wiener Neustadt players
Berliner AK 07 players
SV Babelsberg 03 players
Berliner FC Dynamo players
German expatriate footballers
German expatriate sportspeople in Austria
Expatriate footballers in Austria